The 1913 Northwestern Purple team represented Northwestern University during the 1913 college football season. In their first and only year under head coach Dennis Grady, the Purple compiled a 1–6 record (0–6 against Western Conference opponents) and finished in last place in the Western Conference.

Schedule

References

Northwestern
Northwestern Wildcats football seasons
Northwestern Purple football